Otto Danieli (born c. 1943)  is a Swiss curler and World Champion. He won a gold medal at the 1975 World Curling Championships. He coached the West German team at the 1986 World Women's Curling Championship.

References

External links

Living people
Swiss male curlers
World curling champions
1940s births
Swiss curling coaches